Hassan Assembly seat is one of the 224 seats in Karnataka state assembly in India. It is part of Hassan Lok Sabha seat.

K H Hanumegowda (1930-2018) and H S Prakash have won this seat four times each. Hanumegowda lost 3 elections from here, in 1983 and 1994 as Congress candidate, and in 2008 as Bahujan Samaj Party candidate. And H S Prakash lost in 1999 and 2018.

Members of Assembly 
Source:

Election results

1957 Assembly Election
 K.T. Dasappa (IND) : 16,224 votes    
 L. T. Karle	INC : 13070

1967 Assembly Election
 H. B. Jwalaniah (SWA) : 18,212 votes    
 L. T. Karle	INC : 17933

2018 Assembly Election
 Preetham J. Gowda (BJP) : 63,348 votes  
 H.S.Prakash (JD-S) : 50,342 votes
 H.K. Mahesh (INC) : 38101 votes

See also 
 Hassan District
 List of constituencies of Karnataka Legislative Assembly

References 

Assembly constituencies of Karnataka